Hedda Strand Gardsjord (born 28 June 1982) is a Norwegian footballer who plays as a right-back for Toppserien club Røa IL and the Norway national team.

In January 2009 Gardsjord debuted for the Norway women's national football team in a 5–1 defeat by rivals Sweden in Marbella. She was 26 years old and had never played for Norway's youth teams. Her national team chance came about when five club mates quit international football, following a furious bust-up with coach Bjarne Berntsen.

She was picked for Norway's UEFA Women's Euro 2009 squad and continued to be selected by Berntsen's replacement Eli Landsem. This included a place at the 2011 FIFA Women's World Cup, where Gardsjord played twice as Norway crashed out in the first round. She took an indefinite break from the national team in early 2012, after struggling to balance the demands of travel and training with her other career as a landscape architect.

References

External links
 
 Profile at Røa IL 

1982 births
Living people
Sportspeople from Bærum
Norwegian women's footballers
Norway women's international footballers
Toppserien players
Røa IL players
Women's association football fullbacks
2011 FIFA Women's World Cup players